The Nikon 1 J3 is a Nikon 1 series high-speed mirrorless interchangeable-lens camera by Nikon. It is the successor of the Nikon 1 J2 and predecessor of Nikon 1 J4.

Features
Featuring a 14 megapixel image sensor and further increased autofocus (hybrid autofocus with phase detection/contrast-detect AF and AF-assist illuminator) speed to 15 frames per second (fps), the maximum continuous shooting speed stays at 60 fps for up to 40 frames.

The image processor Expeed 3A, a successor to the Expeed 3 used in the former Nikon 1 series cameras, features a new (according to Nikon) image-processing engine with increased speed of up to 850 megapixels per second. It is developed exclusively for Nikon 1 cameras.

Features list 
 Effective Pixels: 14.2 million
 Sensor Size: 13.2mm x 8.8mm
 Image sensor format: Nikon CX format (a very slight smaller than 1" sensor format)
 Storage Media: SD, SDHC, SDXC
 15 frames per secondwith AF
 30/60 fps with focus locked on first frame
 ISO Sensitivity: 160-6400
 Audio file format: ACC
 Movie file format: MOV
 Monitor Size: 3.0 in. diagonal
 Monitor Type: TFT-LCD with brightness adjustment
 Battery: EN-EL20 Lithium-ion Battery

See also

 Nikon 1 series
 Nikon 1-mount

References

External links
Nikon 1 J3 Product Manual Nikon

Nikon MILC cameras
J3
Cameras introduced in 2013